Morgue Street is a 2012 Italian horror short film directed by Alberto Viavattene and based on Edgar Allan Poe's 1841 short story "The Murders in the Rue Morgue". The film gained notoriety when it was banned in Australia by the Australian Classification Board before it could screen at Sydney's A Night of Horror film festival. It has been praised by Jack Ketchum, Brian Yuzna, and Uwe Boll.

References

External links

2012 films
2012 horror films
Italian horror films
Films based on The Murders in the Rue Morgue
Italian short films
2012 independent films
Italian independent films
2012 short films
Censored films
Horror short films
2010s English-language films
2010s Italian films